The Victorian Individual Speedway Championship is a Motorcycle speedway championship held annually in Australia's southernmost mainland state of Victoria to determine the State champion. The event is organised by the Motorcycling Victoria and is sanctioned by Motorcycling Australia (MA).

Mildura's Phil Crump, father of three time World Champion Jason Crump, holds the record for the most wins having won 13 Victorian Championships between 1972 and 1988.

Seven international riders have won the Victorian Championship. They are Larry Boulton (England - 1933), Ulf Eriksson (Sweden - 1955), Gerry Hussey (England - 1956), Ken McKinlay (Scotland - 1959 & 1961), Ivan Mauger (New Zealand - 1962 & 1963), Roy Trigg (England - 1966, 1969 & 1970) and Bert Harkins (Scotland - 1968).

Winners since 1926/27
Unless stated, all riders are from Victoria

References

External links
Honor Roll since 1927/28

Motorsport competitions in Australia
Speedway in Australia
Sports competitions in Victoria (Australia)